Sobrante Ridge Regional Park, or simply Sobrante Ridge, is a regional park of the East Bay Regional Parks District in Richmond, California. The park has  of trails.

External links 
 Sobrante Ridge Regional Park at the East Bay Regional Parks District website

East Bay Regional Park District
Parks in Richmond, California
Bay Area Ridge Trail